Khomam County is in Gilan province, Iran. The capital of the county is the city of Khomam. At the 2006 census, the county's population (as Khomam District of Rasht County) was 52,050 in 15,059 households. The following census in 2011 counted 53,600 people in 17,492 households. At the 2016 census, the district's population was 54,860, in 18,948 households. It was separated from Rasht County.

Administrative divisions

The population history of Khomam County's administrative divisions (as a district of Rasht County) over three consecutive censuses is shown in the following table.

References

Counties of Gilan Province

fa:شهرستان خمام